Beloeil—Chambly is a federal electoral district in Quebec. It encompasses a portion of Quebec formerly included in the electoral district of Chambly—Borduas.

Beloeil—Chambly was created by the 2012 federal electoral boundaries redistribution and was legally defined in the 2013 representation order. It came into effect upon the call of the 42nd Canadian federal election, which took place on 19 October 2015.

Profile
The NDP did well against the Bloc in the region in the 2011 election, when results are applied to the new riding's boundaries. There was little variation in support for most parties from one part of the riding to another. In the 2015 federal election, the Bloc saw a slight bump in support, while the Liberals jumped more than 20 percentage points, mostly at the expense of the NDP.  In the 2019 election, the Bloc Québécois took control of the seat with a substantial margin, and held onto it in the 2021 election.

Demographics
According to the Canada 2011 Census; 2013 representation

Ethnic groups: 97.2% White 
Languages: 94.4% French, 4.4% English
Religions: 85.8% Christian (82.0% Catholic, 3.7% Other), 13.6% No religion 
Median income (2010): $35,198 
Average income (2010): $42,142

Members of Parliament

This riding has elected the following Members of Parliament:

Election results

References

Quebec federal electoral districts
Chambly, Quebec
La Vallée-du-Richelieu Regional County Municipality
Rouville Regional County Municipality